Czerna  is a village in the administrative district of Gmina Nowogrodziec, within Bolesławiec County, Lower Silesian Voivodeship, in south-western Poland.

The village has a population of 1,100.

History
During World War II, the Germans operated a penal forced labour camp, and the E234 forced labour subcamp of the Stalag VIII-B/344 prisoner-of-war camp in the village.

Transport
The Polish National road 94 passes through the village, and the A4 motorway runs nearby, northwest of the village.

References

Villages in Bolesławiec County